is a Japanese, Tokyo-based company, engaged in the manufacturing and selling of  water treatment equipment, electronic equipment, and information equipment. It is listed on the Tokyo Stock Exchange and is a constituent of the Nikkei 225.

The company was established by Hosui Shigemune for the manufacture of electric motors in Kyobashi, Tokyo.

Business segments and products 
The Company operates in four business segments:
 Social Infrastructure Systems Business
 Power generating systems, power transmission & distribution systems
 Rail electrification, overhead line inspection system
 Motor power and process control systems
 Electrical system for water treatment plant, water purification systems, water quality meters, ceramic membranes
 Industrial Systems Business
 Automobile testing and logistics systems, driving performance simulation systems, motors and inverters
 Industrial computers, network systems for information industries, supporting software for semiconductor production equipment
 Maintenance and Servicing Business
 Energy-saving methods, remote management of equipment, maintenance services for semiconductor manufacturing devices, maintenance skills training service
 Real Estate Business
 Tenancy service and real estate leasing

References

External links

 Official website 
 Domestic Group Companies 
 Overseas Offices and Group Companies 

Electrical engineering companies of Japan
Companies listed on the Tokyo Stock Exchange
Companies listed on the Nagoya Stock Exchange
Engineering companies of Japan
Real estate companies based in Tokyo
Manufacturing companies based in Tokyo
Sumitomo Group
Manufacturing companies established in 1917
Japanese companies established in 1917
Japanese brands